Hastings Borough Council is the local authority for the borough of Hastings, in the county of East Sussex, England. The borough is divided into 12 wards but has no civil parishes, the entire district being an unparished area. The council is based at Muriel Matters House (formerly Aquila House). In 2016 the council acquired Aquila House outright after previously renting it. The MP for Hastings is Sally-Ann Hart and Hastings is part of the Hastings and Rye constituency.

History 
Hastings was an ancient borough. It was reformed under the Municipal Corporations Act 1835 to become a municipal borough. When elected county councils were established under Local Government Act 1888 it was decided that Hastings was sufficiently large to govern itself and so it was made a county borough, independent from East Sussex County Council. On 1 April 1974, under the Local Government Act 1972, the borough became a non-metropolitan district within the non-metropolitan county of East Sussex, giving East Sussex County Council jurisdiction over the town as a higher-tier authority for the first time.

See also 
 Hastings Borough Council elections

References

External links 
 Hastings Borough Council official website

Non-metropolitan district councils of England
Local authorities in East Sussex
Borough Council